Emmanuel de Blommaert de Soye (15 October 1875 – 12 April 1944) was a Belgian horse rider who competed in the 1912 and 1920 Summer Olympics. In 1912 he won the bronze medal in the individual jumping competition, riding Clomore, and finished sixths with the Belgian team in the team jumping event. In the individual dressage competition he was 21st. In the individual eventing contest he was disqualified in the cross country ride, and the Belgian team was unplaced in the team eventing competition, when none of their riders were able to finish.

Eight years later he and his horse Grizzly finished eleventh in the individual dressage event.

References

External links
profile

1875 births
1944 deaths
Belgian male equestrians
Event riders
Belgian dressage riders
Belgian show jumping riders
Olympic equestrians of Belgium
Equestrians at the 1912 Summer Olympics
Equestrians at the 1920 Summer Olympics
Olympic bronze medalists for Belgium
Olympic medalists in equestrian
Medalists at the 1912 Summer Olympics